Nicolao Atelier is a costume manufacturer and supply house based in Venice, Italy. The company has created costumes for the films The Wings of the Dove, The Merchant of Venice and Casanova.

External links
Nicolao Atelier on IMDb
Nicolao Atelier official site

Film organisations in Italy
Clothing companies of Italy
Companies based in Venice